Barkol Kazakh Autonomous County (sometimes Barkul or Balikul in English) is part of Hami Prefecture in Xinjiang and has an area of . It forms part of the China–Mongolia border (bordering the Mongolian provinces of Khovd and Govi-Altai) on the county's north, while bordering Yizhou District to the south, Yiwu County to the east and Changji's Mori Kazakh Autonomous County to the west.

Barkol was made an autonomous county on October 1, 1954. It is noted for camel and horse breeding with the Barkol horse well known throughout China. Due to the large number of camels, which is unparalleled in China, the county is nicknamed of the "county of ten thousand camels".

History
Barkol was a territory of Pulei country in ancient times. During the continuous Han–Xiongnu War, in 72 BC, Emperor Xuan of Han sent Zhao Chongguo as general of Pulei, together with Wusun to attack the Huns. After the Northern Wei Dynasty, Rouran and Gaoche competed for the Pule grassland for a long time. In the fourth year of Tang Jinglong (710), 3,000 Yiwu troops were sent to build a city in Ganluchuan (now the ancient city of Dahe, located in Dongtouqu Village, Dahe Town, Balikun). In the Yuan Dynasty, it belonged to the eastern border of Bechbaliq Province, and was originally called Barkule. In the Ming Dynasty, it belonged to the Oirat Heshuo Special Department. In the thirty-sixth year of Emperor Kangxi of the Qing Dynasty (1697), it was annexed to Hami, and in the ninth year of Yongzheng (1731), the city of Barkule was built, and Anxi Tongzhi was established. In the twenty-fifth year of Qianlong's reign (1760), the Barkun Zhili Hall was built. In the twenty-seventh year of Qianlong's reign (1762), Barkol set up the Admiral's House. In the twenty-ninth year of Qianlong (1764), it was changed to the town standard of Barkol. In the thirty-seventh year of Qianlong (1772), a military city was built in Barkol. In the thirty-eighth year of Qianlong (1773), Zhenxi House was established. Barkol was the regional command center for the pacification of the Dzungar in the early Qing Dynasty. After the establishment of Dihua City, the status of Barkol was replaced by it. In the fifth year of Xianfeng in the Qing Dynasty (1855), the government was changed to Zhili Hall in the west of the town. In the thirteenth year of Tongzhi (1874), Zuo Zongtang smashed Agubai, and took the town west as the army's military station and grain station. A large number of people from Shaanxi and Gansu moved to the west of the town, and the west of the town gradually became an important military town. After 1883, Kazakh herdsmen from Altay and other places moved in one after another. In the second year of the Republic of China (1913), the office was withdrawn and Zhenxi County was established. In the 23rd year of the Republic of China (1934), it was placed under the Hami Administrative Region. At the beginning of 1954, the name of Barkol County was restored, and then the Barkol Kazakh Autonomous Region was established to implement regional autonomy and belong to Hami County. In 1955, the Barkol Kazakh Autonomous Region was changed to Barkol Kazakh Autonomous County. In October 2017, Barkol Kazakh Autonomous County officially withdrew from China's national poverty-stricken county.

Geography and Climate
Barkol Kazakh Autonomous County is located in the hinterland of the Eurasian continent, with a total area of 38,400 square kilometers, including 25,500 square kilometers of mountains and Gobi, accounting for 66% of the total area of ​​the county. The terrain is high in the southeast and low in the northwest, with an average elevation of 1650 meters. In the south is Mount Barkol, in the middle is Mount Moqinura, and in the north is Mount Beita. Barkol Mountain is located on the southern edge of the county and is the eastern section of the Tianshan Mountains. It stretches for more than 160 kilometers within the county, with an average elevation of 3,300 meters. The peaks above 3,600 meters above sea level are covered with snow all year round and there are a large number of glaciers. The central part of Balikun County is the Moqin Wula Mountain, a branch of the Tianshan Mountains. The Moqin Wula Mountain extends from the northwest to the southeast. The northernmost part is the Beita Mountain, the remnant of the Altai Mountains, which belongs to the Eastern Junggar fault block mountain system. There are 1.34 million mu of wetlands. The woodland is 1.227 million mu, the forest coverage rate is 1.45%, and there are more than 500 kinds of wild plants. The wild animals include red deer, snow leopard, wild ass, yellow sheep, wild boar, wolf, sand fox, pine marten, marmot, snow chicken, quail, eagle, falcon Hundreds of species.

The total amount of water resources in Barkol County is 559 million cubic meters, including 357 million cubic meters of surface runoff and 202 million cubic meters of groundwater resources. Mainly rely on alpine glaciers melt water and atmospheric precipitation recharge. At present, the total annual development and utilization of water resources is 186 million cubic meters, including 123 million cubic meters of surface water and 63 million cubic meters of groundwater. There are 46 large and small rivers in the county, with an annual runoff of 212 million cubic meters. The larger rivers include Xiheigou, Dongheigou, Hongshankougou and Liutiao River, with a total annual runoff of 72 million cubic meters. The rivers are mainly concentrated in the mountains around the Balikun Basin and flow to the Barkol Lake. Most of them are seasonal rivers with small water volume, short flow and large seepage. Most of the rivers infiltrate underground soon after exiting the mountain pass. Barkol Lake is a salt water lake with a total area of ​​about 113 square kilometers. There are 556 large and small springs in Barkol, 45 of which can be used for agriculture and animal husbandry. There are 15 glaciers in Barkol, which are distributed on the northern slope of Mount Barkol in the south of the county. There are many small-scale ice bucket glaciers and hanging glaciers. There are flat-topped glaciers on the quasi-plain on the top of the mountain. The glacier area is 8.64 square kilometers. meters, ice reserves of 351 million cubic meters.

More than 30 kinds of mineral resources in Barkol County have been proved, including coal, petroleum, mirabilite, gold and bentonite. Coal resources are mainly distributed in the Santanghu coalfield and the western coalfield, of which the Santanghu coalfield reserves 58.5 billion tons and the western coalfield reserves 31.2 billion tons. The net reserves of thenardite are 48.93 million tons, mainly distributed in Barkol Lake. It is one of the three major alkali sulfide production bases in the country, with a market share of 25% in the country. Oil is mainly distributed in the Santanghu Basin, with predicted oil and gas reserves of 930 million tons, proven oil reserves of 570 million tons and natural gas reserves of 10 billion cubic meters. Barkol Santanghu wind area is one of the nine major wind areas in Xinjiang, with an average annual wind speed of 8.2 m/s, an annual effective wind speed of 7,344 hours, more than 2,300 hours of full-load power generation, and a technological development volume of 48.97 million kilowatts. The installed capacity is 450,000 kilowatts, and the grid-connected power generation is 35 kilowatts, with a cumulative power generation of 889 million kWh.

Barkol Kazakh Autonomous County belongs to the temperate continental cool arid climate zone, with an average altitude of 1,650 meters. It is cold in winter and cool in summer, with sufficient sunlight and four distinct seasons. The average annual temperature is 1℃, the extreme maximum temperature is 35℃, and the extreme minimum temperature is -43.6℃. The frost-free period is 98 to 104 days. The annual precipitation is only about 220 mm, and the evaporation is 1638 mm. The air is dry, the atmospheric transparency is good, the cloud cover is less, the sunshine is sufficient, and the light energy resources are abundant. The annual sunshine hours are 3,170 hours, which is one of the areas with the most sunshine hours in the country. Among them, the Santang Lake Basin has 3,350 sunshine hours throughout the year. hours or more.

Ancient shorelines show up as concentric rings on the satellite photo at right, indicating that water levels have varied many times in the past. One study identified five climates at Lake Barkol over the past 8,000 years, ranging from warm and wet to cold and wet and finally cold and dry at present. The average annual temperature in the area is now just , though temperatures swing from extreme highs to extreme lows.

Population
In the fifth census in 2000, the total resident population of Barkol Kazakh Autonomous County was 85,964, including 12,552 in Barkol Town, 443 in Borqiangji Town, 4,472 in Sarchok Township, 6,229 in Haiziyan Township, and 6,229 in Xialuoba. 5,273 people in township, 17,842 people in Dahe township, 10,018 people in Kuisu township, 7,531 people in Shirenzi township, 6,504 people in Huayuan township, 1,403 people in Santanghu township, 2,915 people in Dahongliuxia township, 1458 people in Baqiangzi township, and Corps Red Mountain There are 6,533 people on the farm and 2,791 people in the Red Star Ranch of the Corps. The county has 22,257 registered permanent households and 85,964 registered permanent residents, including 44,068 males, 41,896 females, and 68,857 agricultural populations.

In the sixth census in 2010, the total resident population of Barkol Kazakh Autonomous County was 75,442, of which 14,313 were in Balikun Town, 1,797 in Borqiangji Town, 9,784 in Dahe Town, 6,635 in Kuishu Town, and 3,662 in Sarchok Township There are 5297 people in Haiziyan Township, 4335 people in Xialuoba Township, 4757 people in Shirenzi Township, 4942 people in Huayuan Township, 1953 people in Santanghu Township, 3388 people in Dahongliuxia Township, and 2037 people in Baqiangzi Township. There are 367 people in the farm, 2,109 people in the Huangtuchang Development Zone, and 10,066 people in the Corps Hongshan Farm. The county has 27,236 registered permanent households and 75,442 registered permanent residents, including 40,038 males, 35,404 females, and 50,775 agricultural populations.

Economy
The economy of Barkol is mainly based on resource-based industry, agriculture, animal husbandry and tourism. In 1996, it was designated as an animal husbandry county by the autonomous region. There are 28.66 million mu of natural grassland and 19.98 million mu of usable grassland, including 180,000 mu of high-quality mowing fields. The main specialty livestock are Barkol horse, Barkol Bactrian camel, Xinjiang brown cattle, Barkol Kazakh meat sheep, and Barkol velvet. Goats, Altai big-tailed sheep, etc. Among them, Barkol's "Likun" brand beef and mutton, and potatoes have been certified by China's national "green food". Barkol has 504,000 mu of arable land, including 366,000 mu of basic farmland, and about 300,000 mu of sown annually. The main agricultural products are potatoes, Dalu vegetables, barley, wheat, late-ripening cantaloupe, etc. Chinese herbal medicines include snow lotus, cistanche, licorice, ephedra , mint, motherwort, wolfberry, etc. Since the 1960s, the construction of the reservoir has provided a good environment for fish growth. In 2010, the water surface area of ​​Barkol was 256.33 hectares, and the main fish were carp and crucian carp. But the water temperature is low, the fish has a long wintering period and a short growth period. The large quantity of Artemia in Lake Barkol is a high-quality fish bait. The main industrial products are coal, wind power, thenardite, alkali sulfide, crude oil, gold, etc.

In 2019, the regional GDP of Barkol Kazakh Autonomous County was 7.86806 billion yuan, the added value of the primary industry was 1.00353 billion yuan, the added value of the secondary industry was 4.35177 billion yuan, the general public budget revenue was 585.06 million yuan, and the general public budget expenditure was 2.1399 billion yuan. The disposable income of urban and rural residents reached 32,387 yuan and 14,758 yuan respectively, and the added value of industries above designated size reached 3 billion yuan. Planting 261,300 mu of wheat, 15,000 mu of edible sunflower, 8,000 mu of open field vegetables and 4,500 mu of potatoes, the coverage rate of good crop varieties is 98%; 6,094 cattle have been improved in cold breeding, with an improvement rate of 75%; 435,100 livestock of various types have been slaughtered. First, the commodity rate reached 85.7%. The annual output of wind power was 5.5 billion kWh, and the output value of agricultural product processing enterprises was 109 million yuan, with online purchases of 27.95 million yuan and sales of 11.38 million yuan, an increase of 67% and 74% respectively. It received 2 million tourists throughout the year, achieved tourism revenue of 500 million yuan, and tax revenue of 119 million yuan.

Culture
Balikun Kazakh Autonomous County has Dahe Ancient City, a national key cultural relic protection unit, Yuegongtai-Xiheigou site group, a key cultural relics protection unit in the autonomous region, the ancient city site of Barkol and the Dongheigou site, one of the top ten new archaeological discoveries in China in 2007. There are 29 beacon sites built in the Tang and Qing dynasties that stretch for more than 200 kilometers, the Renshang Stele during the Eastern Han Dynasty, the Barkol Mingsha Mountain, the Barkol Grassland, the Balikun Lake and tens of thousands of rock paintings and other cultural relics. There are 3 national 4A-level scenic spots, namely, the ancient city of Balikun scenic spot, the scenic spot of Gaojia Lake wetland and the scenic spot of Barkol Lake.

Balikun's specialty snacks mainly include grilled meat, lamb stewed pancakes, soil hot pot, wild mushroom stewed chicken, shaozi noodles, steamed pancakes, barbecued meat, roasted lamb chops, and stewed meat including eight bowls of Xinjiang intangible cultural heritage Barkol soil mat , steamed meat, finger meat, Baoer Shake, horse meat Naren, pilaf, milk tea, etc. The characteristic wild vegetables mainly include Artemisia vulgaris, shallots, wild mushrooms, endives, and wild mustards.

In the thirty-eighth year of Emperor Qianlong's reign in the Qing Dynasty (1773), a professor's yamen was set up in Zhenxi Prefecture, and an education yamen was set up in Yihe County. In the fifth year of Xianfeng (1855), the Zhenxi Hall set up a school and political yamen, and established Songfeng Academy in Wenchang Palace, East Street of Hancheng. In the thirty-second year of Guangxu (1906), the school palace of Yuanyuan Temple was changed to a primary school. In the thirty-fourth year of Guangxu (1908), the elementary school was changed to the second-class school in Zhenxi Hall. In the early years of the Republic of China, 7 schools and schools in the county were merged into Zhenxi County National School. In 1950, there were 15 primary schools with a total of 1232 students. In October 1951, 5 tent primary schools were set up in each of the east and west pastoral areas, recruiting 335 students from pastoral areas. In 2010, there were 25 primary schools, 6 junior middle schools, and 2 senior middle schools. In 2005, the nine-year compulsory education schools in Barkol Kazakh Autonomous County were adjusted and merged from 41 to 29. At present, there are 31 primary and secondary schools in the county, including 21 primary schools, 1 high school, 1 complete middle school, and 8 nine-year schools.

Transportation
In 1939, a simple road was built from Hami to Zhenxi County via Songshutang. In 2002, it was extended westward from Barkol County to Fukang, called Hafu Line, that is, Provincial Road 303. In 1956, the Barkol County Transportation Station was established, and the passenger shuttle bus to and from Hami was opened. In the 1980s, the reconstruction and expansion of rural roads began, and in the 1990s, the roads from county towns to townships were basically smooth. In 2010, the county's provincial highway mileage reached 209 kilometers. On May 20, 2021, the Barkol section of Beijing-Xinjiang Expressway was fully completed.

References

Kazak autonomous counties
Sites along the Silk Road
Hami